The 1976 British National Track Championships were a series of track cycling competitions held from 7–14 August 1976 at the Leicester Velodrome.

Medal summary

Men's Events

Women's Events

References

National Track Championships
British National Track Championships